Donkey Xote (known in some regions as Donkey X or Aeslet) is a 2007 3D computer-animated children's film produced by Lumiq Studios. A co-production between Spain and Italy, the film is directed by José Pozo and written by Angel Pariente, based on the Miguel de Cervantes novel Don Quixote, and features the voices of Andreu Buenafuente, David Fernández, Sonia Ferrer and José Luis Gil. The film has gained notiriety as a mockbuster as the lead character Rucio bears an intentional resemblance to Donkey from the Shrek film series, along with the poster having the tagline "From the producers who saw Shrek".

Donkey Xote was presented at the Cannes Film Festival in May 2012, and theatrically released on 22 November 2007 by Lumiq Studios and Filmax International. It grossed €12 million ($18 million) on a €13 million ($19 million) budget.

Plot
The film begins with a narration of the story as told by Cervantes, but the narrator is interrupted by the donkey Rucio who insists on telling the "true" story of the adventure: Don Quixote was not crazy, but in fact an intelligent and passionate person. In Rucio's re-telling of his adventure with Don Quixote and his squire, Sancho Panza, we learn that Rucio wishes he were Quixote's horse, and that the horse, Rocinante, hates leaving his stable.

As it develops, Dulcinea has a difficult time choosing between the knight and his wealthy sidekick. The rivalry between Quixote and Panza leads the two on a journey across Spain to Barcelona as they both vie for the beautiful woman's affections. To defend his honor among the imposters, the real Quixote must duel and win against the Knight of the Moon in order to learn the true identity of Dulcinea. With little help from a spirit in a Magic Armor.

Voice cast
 Luis Posada as Rucio
 Andreu Buenafuente as Sancho Panza
 David Fernández as Rocinante
 Sonia Ferrer as Dulcinea from Tobosso
 José Luis Gil as Don Quixote de La Mancha
 Sancho Gracia as Sansón Carrasco
 Jordi Hurtado as Cronista Estadio de Justas
 Jordi González as El Narrador
 María Luisa Solá as Duquesa
 Félix Benito as Duque

Production
The project entered pre-production in late 2004, and was a co-financed effort of Spain's 'Filmax Animation' and Italy's 'Lumiq Studios', with Lumiq handling 40% of the animation, making use of the combined work of over 150 technicians and Italian artists who specialize in 3D animation.  While still in production, a distribution deal with Lusomundo was negotiated. The film's trailer was released in May 2007 at SIGGRAPH, and post-production on the feature continued through 2007.

Release

Film and DVD
The film premiered on November 22, 2007, in Toledo, Spain, and had its festival premiere on November 27, 2007, at the Ourense International Film Festival.  The film was introduced to the European Film Market in February 2008, and screened in March at the 10th annual 'Cartoon Movie' at Babelsberg Studios in Potsdam, Germany.  First released in Spanish as Donkey Xote, the film was dubbed into other languages and had non-Spanish actors doing the voicework for international distribution.  Among its non-Spanish release, it was released by Phase 4 Films as Donkey X in the U.S. and Canada, as Aasi ja puolikuun ritari (The donkey and the half-moon knight) in Finland, as Don Chichot in Poland, as Don Kihotis in Greece, as Don Kisot in Turkey, as Don Quijote szamarancsa in Hungary, as Donkey Schott in Germany, as Măgăruşul buclucaş (Troublesome Donkey) in Romania, as Les Folles Aventures De Rucio (Rucio's Crazy Adventures) in France. and as A Donkey's Tale in the United Kingdom.

Video game
One year after release of the film, a video game by the same name was commissioned of the company Revistronic Madrid with V.2 Play publishing it. The results were an adventure game for PC and PlayStation 2, one for PSP, and one for Nintendo DS which consisted of several mini-games tailored to the characteristics of the portable console.

Reception

Critical response
Variety made note that the lead character of Rucio has an intentional resemblance to the character of Donkey from the Shrek series, with its original theatrical poster proclaiming "From the producers who saw Shrek". They noted that, while the physical resemblance was imported "almost wholesale", the character lacked the same wit as its inspiration. They wrote that the film was "a lively but clumsy comic retelling of the Cervantes classic" with a "humdrum" script. Ahora noted the same resemblance, writing that it was a blatant imitation done in order to take advantage of the existing commercial fanbase established by DreamWorks for the Shrek films. NonSoloCinema wrote that while the animation is well-made, the figures resemble characters from Pixar's early days and has obvious similarities to some of the stars of Shrek by DreamWorks. DVD Verdict offered that in order to market the film to a pre-teen audience, Rucio looks "suspiciously" like Donkey from the Shrek movies. Film Up wrote "The film (which in turn has inspired a video game of the same name), has the merit, in part, to be able to convince us and involve us, but sometimes, creativity and commitment, may not be enough, because the quality is more important, even if not always for everyone."

In making comparisons to other representations of the original novel, Rapadura wrote that the plot was encrusted with facts and comical characters, but was simpler. They offered that, while the opening sequences had a great pace and hinted at expectations of good insights of the script, it gave a misimpression of what followed. They wrote that the film had a "falta de graça" (lack of humor) in that it is a satire by "produtores que assistiram a Shrek" (producers who saw Shrek). Toward the story, they felt that screenwriter Angel Pariente was unable to create charisma in his characters and thus created a plot full of holes, and that the direction of Jose Pozo contributed to its failure. Another concern was that the soundtrack of American tunes, aimed toward winning a pre-teen audience, was repetitive and misapplied. In their own review, Cine Pop appreciated that the film was an attempt at reinterpretation of the classic Don Quixote, but felt that the script ends without cohesion with a flurry of small plots and a whirlwind of characters. They also felt that the tunes for the soundtrack, while daring, were unfortunate choices that did not meet the expected requirements of the scenes in which they were heard. They concluded by offering that the film did have two successes: first, the technique in animation was very well done. After developing the look of the characters, everything was impeccable. Second, the film is an incentive to re-read Don Quixote, acting to encourage young viewers to engage in the original book.

DVD Talk panned the film, writing "The best thing about Donkey Xote is its title, a whimsically mischievous little pun. The worst thing about Donkey Xote is everything else." They felt that, while the filmmakers asserted they were making a sequel to a literary classic, their work was less inspired by Cervantes, so much as it was DreamWorks. They noted the tone was "non-stop Shrek, so much so that the Eddie Murphy character gets a shout-out" when the character of Rucio jokes "the only talking donkey I know is a friend of mine who hangs out with a green ogre". The offered that the film's basic premise showed potential, in its setting up a tale where "years after Quixote's quests, Cervantes' chronicles of the tale have gone on to great success, and now every fool in the land wants to be his own Don Quixote. The real Quixote and Sancho Panza, meanwhile, remain poor, until word arrives of a knight festival culminating in a chance to win the hand of the lovely Dulcinea." They also granted that this set up had some "almost-clever moments" when the real Quixote has to prove himself "amidst a crowd of wannabees." But they argue that screenwriter Angel Pariente did not allow these moments to makes sense, thus making them too rare, and that the plot became so convoluted in jumping from tangent to tangent that sorting it out became "a major hassle". Unlike reviewers that felt the animation was a sole redeeming quality, they felt it appeared cheap, in that while background elements were rendered in great detail, they were "one-upped by blocky, generic character work and uninspired designs, all with a plastic look that feels rushed," giving the results a "bargain bin feel." They summarized that the film offered "a nonsensical plot and tiresome jokes, like a third-rate DreamWorks rip-off with half the story missing." DVD Verdict also panned the film, writing it was a "silly, nonsensical retelling" of the Don Quixote tale. They felt that as the film was based upon a classic novel filled with "memorably outlandish characters, loads of surreal plot twists, and compelling universal themes about the nature of identity and the conflict between reality and the imagination", the project concept had potential. But they offered that director Jose Pozo failed in reaching that goal, as his work failed "to congeal around a focused theme, its plot is a baffling semi-episodic affair full of narrative dead-ends and non sequiturs." They felt this was compounded by the characters becoming forgettable, "despite Quixote and Panza being two of the most distinctive characters in the entire history of literature," with Angel Pariente's adaptation to be "muddled and confused", with a gross misdevelopment of the characters. Cervantes' older, serious Don Quixote was reduced to be a clueless but handsome young man. Sancho Panza, one of the most likeable persons in the long history of sidekicks, was "transformed into a cynical, mercenary douche bag". The noble steed Rocinante "is an effeminate, neurotic loser", and the character of Rucio "lacks the personality to pull off his leading man status." In their comments toward the film being a poorman's copy of something from Pixar or DreamWorks, they noted the story included a lion that looked like Scar from The Lion King and a villain that has the same appearance as Syndrome from The Incredibles. They did note that while the animation was less supple than that of the two mentioned American firms, it was still impressive, but concluded that due to its mis-use of "beloved literary characters" and its "thieving from better animated features", the film was "a wanton act of bad taste." PopMatters offered that the "character design is so Shrek-like, the studio [DreamWorks Animation] should sue."

Awards and nominations
 2008, Gaudí Awards nomination for Best Animated Feature (Millor Pel·lícula d'Animació)
 2009, Goya Awards nomination for Best Animation Film (Mejor Película de Animación)

Soundtrack
 "Dónde Están Mis Sueños", by Jordi Cubino, Performed by Marta Sánchez
 "A New Day Has Come", by Stephan Moccio and Aldo Nova, Performed by Elisabeth Gray
 "Hit Me With Your Best Shot", by Eddie Schwartz, Performed by Tessa
 "Born Free", by Don Black and John Barry, Performed by Alex Warner
 "True Colours", by Tom Kelly and Billy Steinberg, Performed by Elisabeth Gray
 "I Fought the Law", by Sonny Curtis, Performed by Alex Warner
 "Games People Play", by Joe South, Performed by Alex Warner

See also

References

External links
 
 Donkey Xote at the Internet Movie Database
 Official Fanpage https://www.facebook.com/pages/Donkey-Xote/460735943942351

2007 films
2007 computer-animated films
2007 action films
Spanish computer-animated films
Italian animated films
2000s Spanish-language films
Films based on Don Quixote
Filmax films
Castelao Producciones films
2000s children's animated films
Mockbuster films